Aston Library is a public library in Aston, West Midlands, England, built in 1881. It is a Grade II listed building.

History and description
The building, designed by William Henman, was erected in 1880-81. It was slightly smaller than had been originally planned; the original intention, to house the offices of Aston Manor, with a separate building for the library, was amended so that the library was on the ground floor, and the boardroom and offices were on the first floor.

The Manor of Aston became a borough in 1903, with council offices in the building. From 1911, Aston was part of the city of Birmingham. The building is now a public library of Birmingham City Council.

It is described in the listing text as designed in "a loosely Jacobean style". The building, on the corner of Witton Road and Albert Road, is nearly symmetrical. It has an octagonal corner turret at the centre, surmounted by a weather vane bearing the date 1881.

There are fifteen bays on either side of the turret, divided into clusters of three bays. Above the Witton Road entrance is a stone pediment and a tablet which reads "FREE LIBRARY". The Albert Road entrance has an arched portal, leading to a porch where there is a granite foundation stone showing the name of the architect.

References

External links

Grade II listed library buildings
Grade II listed buildings in Birmingham
Libraries in Birmingham, West Midlands
Library buildings completed in 1881